Donald Eugene Lenhardt (October 4, 1922 – July 9, 2014) was an American outfielder, first baseman, third baseman, scout and coach in American Major League Baseball. He was nicknamed "Footsie" by teammates because he often had difficulty finding shoes that fit him properly.

Lenhardt was born in Alton, Illinois, paternal side of Danube Swabians Ancestry from Austria-Hungary. He attended the University of Illinois and Washington University in St. Louis, and served in the United States Navy, before joining the St. Louis Browns' farm system in 1946, signed by scout Lou Maguolo. Lenhardt led the Illinois–Indiana–Iowa League in home runs in 1948 and was promoted to the major league parent club Browns at the start of the 1950 season at age 27. 

He would play in the American League for five seasons (1950–54) for the Browns (twice), Chicago White Sox, Boston Red Sox (twice), Detroit Tigers and Baltimore Orioles, where as a transplanted St. Louis Brown he was a member of the first modern Baltimore MLB team in 1954. In 481 games, he batted .271 with 401 hits, 64 doubles, nine triples, 61 home runs and 239 runs batted in.

After finishing his playing career with Boston farm clubs in 1955–56, Lenhardt became a Midwest-area scout for the Red Sox for over four decades, interrupting that tenure only to serve as first-base coach on Eddie Kasko's staff in Boston from 1970 to 1973. He retired from the Red Sox in 2004, and died at age 91 on July 9, 2014.

References

Marcin, Joe, ed., The Baseball Register 1970 edition. St. Louis: The Sporting News.

External links

Nowlin, Bill, Don Lenhardt, Society for American Baseball Research Biography Project

1922 births
2014 deaths
Aberdeen Pheasants players
American expatriate baseball players in Cuba
Baltimore Orioles players
Baseball players from Illinois
Boston Red Sox coaches
Boston Red Sox players
Boston Red Sox scouts
Chicago White Sox players
Detroit Tigers players
Louisville Colonels (minor league) players
Major League Baseball first base coaches
Major League Baseball outfielders
Pittsburg Browns players
St. Louis Browns players
San Antonio Missions players
San Francisco Seals (baseball) players
Springfield Browns players
United States Navy personnel of World War II
Washington University in St. Louis alumni